In Christian iconography, Christ Pantocrator is a specific depiction of Christ.  Pantocrator or Pantokrator,  literally ruler of all, but usually translated as "Almighty" or "all-powerful", is derived from one of many names of God in Judaism.

The Pantokrator, largely an Eastern Orthodox or Eastern Catholic theological conception, is less common under that name in Western Roman Catholicism and largely unknown to most Protestants. In the West, the equivalent image in art is known as Christ in Majesty, which developed a rather different iconography.  Christ Pantocrator has come to suggest Christ as a mild but stern, all-powerful judge of humanity.

When the Hebrew Bible was translated into Greek as the Septuagint, Pantokrator was used both for YHWH Sabaoth "Lord of Hosts" and for El Shaddai "God Almighty". The references to God the Father and God the Son in Revelation are at times interchangeable, but Pantokrator appears to be reserved for the Father except, perhaps, in 1:8.

Meaning

The most common translation of Pantocrator is "Almighty" or "All-powerful". In this understanding, Pantokrator is a compound word formed from the Greek words ,  (GEN  ), i.e. "strength", "might", "power". This is often understood in terms of potential power; i.e., ability to do anything, omnipotence. Christ pantocrator signifies Jesus in his glory during his second coming seated on his throne.

Another, more literal translation is "Ruler of All" or, less literally, "Sustainer of the World". In this understanding, Pantokrator is a compound word formed from the Greek for "all" and the verb meaning "To accomplish something" or "to sustain something". This translation speaks more to God's actual power; i.e., God does everything (as opposed to God can do everything).

Iconography

The icon of Christ Pantokrator is one of the most common religious images of Orthodox Christianity. Generally speaking, in Byzantine art church art and architecture, an iconic mosaic or fresco of Christ Pantokrator occupies the space in the central dome of the church, in the half-dome of the apse, or on the nave vault. Some scholars (Latourette 1975: 572) consider the Pantocrator a Christian adaptation of images of Zeus, such as the great statue of Zeus enthroned at Olympia. The development of the earliest stages of the icon from Roman Imperial imagery is easier to trace.

The image of Christ Pantocrator was one of the first images of Christ developed in the Early Christian Church and remains a central icon of the Eastern Orthodox Church. In the half-length image, Christ holds the New Testament in his left hand and makes the gesture of teaching or of blessing with his right. 
The typical Western Christ in Majesty is a full-length icon. In the early Middle Ages, it usually presented Christ in a mandorla or other geometric frame, surrounded by the Four Evangelists or their symbols.

The oldest known surviving example of the icon of Christ Pantocrator was painted in encaustic on panel in the sixth or seventh century, and survived the period of destruction of images during the Iconoclastic disputes that twice racked the Eastern church, 726 to 787 and 814 to 842. It was preserved in Saint Catherine's Monastery, in the remote desert of the Sinai. The gessoed panel, finely painted using a wax medium on a wooden panel, had been coarsely overpainted around the face and hands at some time around the thirteenth century. When the overpainting was cleaned in 1962, the ancient image was revealed to be a very high-quality icon, probably produced in Constantinople.

The icon, traditionally half-length when in a semi-dome, which became adopted for panel icons also, depicts Christ fully frontal with a somewhat melancholy and stern aspect, with the right hand raised in blessing or, in the early encaustic panel at Saint Catherine's Monastery, the conventional rhetorical gesture that represents teaching. The left hand holds a closed book with a richly decorated cover featuring the Cross, representing the Gospels. An icon where Christ has an open book is called "Christ the Teacher", a variant of the Pantocrator. Christ is bearded, his brown hair centrally parted, and his head is surrounded by a halo. The icon usually has a gold ground comparable to the gilded grounds of Byzantine mosaics.

Often, the name of Christ is written on each side of the halo, as IC and XC. Christ's fingers are depicted in a pose that represents the letters IC, X and C, thereby making the Christogram ICXC (for "Jesus Christ"). The IC is composed of the Greek characters iota (Ι) and lunate sigma (C; instead of Σ, ς)—the first and last letters of 'Jesus' in Greek; in XC the letters are chi (Χ) and again the lunate sigma—the first and last letters of 'Christ' in Greek.

In many cases, Christ has a cruciform halo inscribed with the letters Ο Ω Ν, i.e.  "He Who Is".

See also

Christ the Redeemer
Monumento al Divino Salvador del Mundo
Salvator Mundi
Transfiguration of Jesus
Symbolism of domes

References

Footnotes

Bibliography

 Latourette, Kenneth Scott, 1975. A History of Christianity, Volume 1, "Beginnings to 1500". Revised edition. (San Francisco: HarperCollins) 
 Christopher Schonborn, Lothar Kraugh (tr.) 1994. God's Human Face: The Christ Icon. Originally published as Icôn du Christ: Fondements théologiques élaborés entre le Ie et IIe Conciles de Nicée (Fribourg) 1976

Further reading 

 Chatzidakis, Manolis (September 1967). "An Encaustic Icon of Christ at Sinai".  Gerry Walters, tr. The Art Bulletin 49.3, pp. 197–208.
 Galavaris, George (Jan 1, 1981). The Icon in the Life of the Church, 11.  Brill Academic Publishers.

External links

 The Christ Pantocrator Icon at St. Catherine's Monastery in the Sinai
 The icon Christ Pantocrator at Chilandar Monastery on Holy Mount Athos
 The Deesis Pantocrator in Hagia Sophia

Christian terminology
Eastern Orthodox icons
Iconography of Jesus
Christology
Books in art